Noyemberyan City Stadium is a football stadium in Noyemberyan, Tavush Province, Armenia.

Overview
The football field of Noyemberyan known as the "Central" during the Soviet times, was renovated between 2008 and 2013. Finally, the new Noyemberyan City Stadium was opened on 18 October 2013, with a capacity of 100 seats only. It is envisaged to install a permanent stand at the northern side of the pitch to increase the capacity up to 1,500 seats.

The total cost of the stadium was equal to AMD 165 million.

The pitch was the home venue of Aznavour FC of Noyemberyan. The club used the stadium for the domestic competitions between 1981 and 1997 when it was dissolved due to financial difficulties.

It is currently used as a training centre for the youth football teams of the region.

References

Football venues in Armenia
Buildings and structures in Tavush Province